Sacred Heart Seminary may refer to:

 Sacred Heart Major Seminary, in Detroit, Michigan
 Sacred Heart Seminary and School of Theology, in Hales Corners, Wisconsin
 Sacred Heart Seminary, Poonamallee in Tamil Nadu, India
 Sacred Heart Seminary, a closed Catholic seminary in Fort Wayne, Indiana, in operation from 1939 to 1948
 Sacred Heart Seminary, a closed Catholic school in Hempstead, New York, in operation from 1869 to 1994

See also
Sacred Heart school (disambiguation)
Sacred Heart Academy (disambiguation)